was a Japanese football player and manager.

Coaching career
Miura was born in Shizuoka Prefecture on April 12, 1956. In 1992, he became a coach at Nagoya Grampus Eight. In November 1994, manager Gordon Milne resigned and Miura managed last two matches in this season as caretaker. In 1997, he signed with Japan Football League club Kawasaki Frontale and served as a coach. In 1998, he moved to Vissel Kobe and served as a coach. In 1999, he returned to Nagoya Grampus Eight. In July 2001, manager João Carlos was sacked and Miura became a new manager and managed until end of 2001 season.

On April 28, 2018, Miura died of an adenocarcinoma of the lung in Toyota at the age of 62.

Managerial statistics

References

External links

1956 births
2018 deaths
Association football people from Shizuoka Prefecture
Japanese footballers
Japanese football managers
J1 League managers
Nagoya Grampus managers
Association footballers not categorized by position